F.C. Bavaria Tultitlan is a football club that plays in the Mexican Football League Segunda División Profesional. The club is based in Tultitlán, Mexico State, Mexico. The club is an affiliate to German club FC Bayern Munich.

See also
Football in Mexico

References 

Football clubs in the State of Mexico
2011 establishments in Mexico